Gajanayake Arachchige Samuditha Dhananjaya Siriwardena, popularly as Dhananjaya Siriwardena, is an actor in Sri Lankan cinema, theater and television. Hailed from a family of artists, Siriwardena is also a television host.

Personal life
His father Sunil Siriwardana is a musician and a renowned lyricist in Sri Lanka and mother Susiri Siriwardena is also a lyricist. His elder brother Madhumadhawa Aravinda is also a popular singer, actor as well as a politician.

Dhananjaya is married to Shashini. She is a flight attendant in Dubai. Dhananjaya first met Shashini in 2005 during a photo shoot of Indika Mallawaarachchi. The couple has one daughter Maurya Shiny, who was born on 1 July 2020.

Dhananjaya's grandfather, Peter Siriwardena was an accomplished musician and an actor. He worked as a lecturer in music at the Government Women's Training College, Polgolla. Dhananjaya's grandmother Srimathi Karuna Devi was a music teacher as well as an actress.

Dhananjaya's aunt Chandrika Siriwardena is also a popular songstress and playback singer. She was married to Anton Alwis, who was a journalist as well as a lyricist. Anton died on 26 March 2018 at the age of 64. Chandrika's granddaughter Dulshara Dasanthi is also a singer.

Career
In 2004, he debuted as a mainstream actor in Me Paren Enna which was directed by Asoka Handagama and produced by YA TV. His performance in the drama was rewarded at the inaugural Raigam Tele'es ceremony in 2005, as the Best Actor. His maiden cinema acting came through Kumara Kanyawi directed by K. A. Wijeratne.

He conducts performing arts classes called Prana. In 2008, he acted in Sri Lanka's first Digital movie named Hetawath Mata Adaraya Karanna. The film was telecast on the Valentine's Day, February 14, 2008 through Citi Hitz Satellite movie channel of Dialog Television.

Selected television serials

 Adaraneeya Poornima
 Adariye 
 Amaya 
 Anantha
 Ayomi 
 Chandi Kumarihami 
 Gal Pilimaya Saha Bol Pilimaya
 Handuna Gaththoth Oba Ma
 Haras Paara
 Hiruta Pipena Suriyakantha 
 Jeewithaya Dakinna 
 Laabai Apple
 Maada Eyama Wiya
 Mama Newei Mama
 Mayura Asapuwa 
 Me Paren Enna
 Mila
 Millewa Walawwa
 Rathriyawee
 Potawetiya
 Ridi Duvili
 Sakura Mal
 Sanda Nodutu Sanda
 Sanda Pini Bideka
 Sanhinda Pamula
 Saranganaa
 Sath Rala Pela
 See Raja
 Senehasa Kaviyak
 Sillara Samanallu
 Sithaka Mahima
 Sudu Gindara
 Sujatha
 Thanamalvila Kollek 
 Thunpath Ratawaka Lassana 
 Veeduru Mal 
 Wasuda

Filmography

Awards and nominations

References

External links

ලබන අවුරුද්ද මගේ අවුරුද්ද - ධනංජය අලුත් බලාපොරොත්තුවක
“සමහරුන්ට අපේ පවුල් කඩනකම් විසුමක් නෑ”
Pride and patriotism!

Living people
Sri Lankan male television actors
Sinhalese male actors
Sri Lankan male film actors
Year of birth missing (living people)